Protomyctophum choriodon is a species of lanternfish.

References

Lampanyctus
Taxa named by P. Alexander Hulley
Fish described in 1981